Jürgen Klinge (born 27 June 1940) is a German former wrestler. He competed in the men's Greco-Roman 97 kg at the 1968 Summer Olympics.

References

External links
 

1940 births
Living people
German male sport wrestlers
Olympic wrestlers of East Germany
Wrestlers at the 1968 Summer Olympics
Sportspeople from Leipzig